Gary Hambly (born 18 April 1956) is an Australian former professional rugby league footballer who played in the 1970s and 1980s. He played for the South Sydney Rabbitohs in the New South Wales Rugby League (NSWRL) competition. He primarily played in the front row.

A Mascot junior, Hambly was selected to represent New South Wales in the front row for the inaugural State of Origin contest in 1980.

In late 1983, Hambly joined English club York for a season and later played for the Wagga Magpies in the Country Rugby League competition.

Hambly is the cousin of former test forward, Brian Hambly.

References

1956 births
Living people
Australian rugby league players
New South Wales Rugby League State of Origin players
Rugby league props
South Sydney Rabbitohs players
York Wasps players